Lew Allen Award for Excellence is a medal of the Jet Propulsion Laboratory. Established in 1986 as the Director’s Research Achievement Award; it was then renamed in honor of JPL's Director Lew Allen when he retired in 1990. This award recognises significant accomplishments or leadership early in an individual's professional career at the Jet Propulsion Laboratory.

Lew Allen Award for Excellence Recipients 
 1990
 Robert W. Fathauer and True-Lon Lin
 Randall R. Friedl
 Brian D. Hunt
 William R. McGrath
 1991
 Michael H. Hecht
 Kevin J. Hussey
 Randy D. May
 David P. Miller
 1992
 Lloyd D. Bell II
 Edward T. Chow
 James L. Fanson
 Eric R. Fossum
 1993
 Pierre F. Baldi
 Usama M. Fayayad
 Seth R. Marder
 Patrick J. Smyth
 1994
 Rajiv S. Desai
 Sarath Gunapala
 David C. Redding
 1995
 Steve A. Chien
 George A. Hajj
 Michael E. Hoenk
 Gloria L. Manney
 1996
 Yi Chao
 Alexander S. Konopliv
 W. Thomas Pike
 1997
 Shouleh Nikzad
 Bedabrata Pain
 Paul Stolorz
 1998
 Michael E. Ressler
 Eric J. Rignot
 Simon H. Yueh
 1999
 James Bock
 Son van Nghiem
 Adrian Stoica
 2000
 Richard Dekany
 Andrea Donnellan
 Sabrina M. Grannan (Feldman)
 2001
 Ayanna Howard
 Ian Joughin
 Victoria S. Meadows
 Juergen Mueller
 2002
 Serge Dubovitsky
 Andrew Edie Johnson 
 Dmitry Strekalov 
 2003
 Jennifer Dooley 
 Christophe Dumas 
 Eui-Hyeok Yang
 2004
 Andrey Matsko
 Alina Moussessian
 Charles Norton
 Michael Seiffert
 2005
 Daniel Stern (aka Stevens)
 Linda del Castillo 
 Lorene Samoska 
 2006
 Amanda Hendrix 
 Harish Manohara
 Adrian Ponce
 2007
 Jason Rhodes
 Paul Johnson
 2008
 Pekka Kangaslahti
 Ioannis Mikellides 
 Hui Su 
 Kiri Wagstaff
 2009
 Charles Matt Bradford
 Cory Hill
 Jeffrey Norris
 Josh Willis 
 2010
 Shannon Brown
 Julie Castillo-Rogez
 Amy Mainzer
 Nathan Strange
 2011
 Ken Cooper
 Kevin Hand
 Richard Hofer
 Eric Larour 
 2012
 Marina Brozović
 Ian Clark 
 Baris Erkmen 
 Christian Frankenberg
 2013
 Abigail Allwood
 Carmen Boening
 Michael Mischna
 David Thompson 
 2014
 Rodney Anderson 
 Michelle Gierach
 Robert Hodyss 
 Aaron Parness, for development of new climbing robots and robotic grippers with widespread application to space and terrestrial exploration
 2015
 Darmindra Arumugam, for inventing and developing Active and Passive Magneto-Quasi-Static Positioning for long-range near-field positioning for non-line of sight environments
 Sabah Bux, for leadership in the development of novel high performance high temperature nanocomposite bulk thermoelectric materials using advanced synthetic methods
 Damon Landau, for innovation in mission architecting and mission design, and for leadership and creativity in the development of advanced mission concepts
 Jason Williams, for innovative research in ultra-cold atoms, atom interferometry, and fundamental physics
 2016
 Mathieu Choukroun, for pioneering studies of the physical properties of cryogenic materials and contributions to MIRO and the US Rosetta mission
 Andrew Klesh, for technical leadership of deep space smallsats and under-ice robotic rover technologies in support of terrestrial and outer planets exploration
 Boon Lim, for leadership and technological innovation in the emerging field of microwave remote sensing science on nanosatellites
 David Wiese, for exceptional leadership and research roles in GRACE data processing and Earth gravity science
 2017
 Piyush Agram, for major contributions to InSAR-based geodetic imaging and geophysical time series analysis
 Nacer Chahat, for demonstrated unique talent as a leader in rapid spacecraft antenna development and telecom systems engineering for CubeSats 
 Arezou Khoshakhlagh, for technical innovation in developing the novel Gallium-free antimonides superlattice epitaxial material system for advanced mid-wavelength and long-wavelength infrared detectors
 Sylvain Piqueux, for leadership in the study of surface thermal properties of terrestrial worlds, and support of JPL missions to these bodies
 2018
 Laura Barge, for pioneering research on the application of electrochemistry to studies of the origin and emergence of life.
 Alex Gardner, for establishing a new unified system architecture to process Cryosphere data, leading to new scientific discoveries related to the evolution of polar ice caps.
 Cecile Jung-Kubiak, for demonstrated excellence in the development of innovative silicon micromachining techniques that have enabled novel electromagnetic, mechanical, and propulsion devices.
 Jose Siles, for the development of high-power ultra-compact room-temperature multi-pixel terahertz sources and receivers for balloon-borne and space instruments.
 2019
 Davide Farnocchia, for exceptional leadership and research roles in orbit reconstruction and prediction of asteroids and comets.
 Marco Lavalle, for sustained leadership in creating and advancing new Earth-science applications of Interferometric Synthetic Aperture Radar.
 Joseph Masiero, for his work in establishing the physical properties of near-Earth asteroids and the threats they pose to Earth.
 Maria Fernanda Mora, for excellence in the development and validation of chemical analysis methodology and electrophoresis instruments for future life detection missions.
 2020
 Brian Bue, For exceptional contributions to machine-learning for remote sensing systems. Morgan Cable, For exceptional contributions to our understanding of chemistry on Titan’s surface. Benjamin Hamlington, For exceptional contributions to understanding sea level change. Sidharth Misra, For exceptional contributions to digital microwave radiometry. 2021
 Ali-akbar Agha-mohammadi (Ali Agha), For exceptional leadership and technological innovation in the emerging field of AI in support of autonomous exploration of extreme terrains. Emmanuel Decrossas, For outstanding leadership and technological innovation advancing the field of low frequency antenna simulation and measurements. Jonathan Hobbs, For outstanding accomplishments in research and development of uncertainty quantification approaches for atmospheric retrievals. Laura Kerber, For exceptional scientific leadership and research on the geology and geophysics of the terrestrial planets and of the Moon.''

See also 
 List of space technology awards
 List of awards named after people

References 

American awards
Jet Propulsion Laboratory